Eric Newman may refer to:
* Eric P. Newman (1911–2017), American numismatist
 Eric Newman, stage name Stagga Lee (born 1977), American rapper
 Eric Clinton Kirk Newman, birth name of Luka Magnotta (born 1982), Canadian pornographic actor and model convicted of murder
 Eric Newman (producer), American film producer
 Eric Newman (footballer) (1924–1971), English goalkeeper
 Eric Newman (baseball) (born 1972), American baseball coach and pitcher